The Foshan Metro (branded as FMetro) is the rapid transit system of the city of Foshan in Guangdong, China. Guangfo line is operated by Guangzhou Metro Corporation, and all other lines are operated by the state-owned Foshan Rail Transit Group. It is the tenth metro system to be built in mainland China. Construction began in 2002 and the first line opened on 3 November 2010. The metro system has one new line and one extension under construction.

Lines in operation

Guangfo Line (Line 1)

The line is owned by Guangdong Guangfo Inter-City Co., Ltd., a subsidiary co-owned by Guangzhou Metro (51%) and FMetro (49%), and currently operated by Guangzhou Metro Corporation. The first section of the line, from Xilang to Kuiqi Lu in Foshan, opened for operation in November 2010. The most recent extension from Yangang to Lijiao was opened on 28 December 2018.

Line 2 

Line 2 was independently invested, constructed and operated by FMetro. The first and currently open phase of Line 2 began construction in 2014 and was opened on 28 December 2021. The second phase, a  westerly extension into Gaoming District has been approved by the NDRC for construction.

Line 3 

Line 3 currently runs  km from Shunde College Railway Station in Shunde District north to Zhen'an in Chancheng District. Most of its 22 stations are underground, with 2 stations elevated. The initial section of Line 3's first phase opened on 28 December 2022, with the rest of the first phase extending the line to Foshan University Xianxi Campus for a total length of  expected to open by the end of 2023.

Gaoming Tram Line 1

Nanhai Tram Line 1

Lines under construction and future expansions

Expansion plans

Fares and tickets

Fares
There was a debate between Foshan and Guangzhou over fares of Guangfo metro. The debate has since been settled as Foshan accepted Guangzhou's fare proposal. FMetro gave out 16,000 tickets for free when it first began operating in November 2010.

See also

 Guangzhou Metro
 Dongguan Rail Transit
 Shenzhen Metro
 Hong Kong MTR
 List of rapid transit systems
 Metro systems by annual passenger rides

References

External links

 FMetro
 Urbanrail Page on Guangzhou and Foshan Metro

 
Rapid transit in China
Rail transport in Guangdong
Underground rapid transit in China
Railway lines opened in 2010